Federal Neuro-Psychiatric Hospital, Maiduguri is a federal government of Nigeria speciality hospital located in Maiduguri, Borno State, Nigeria. The current chief medical director is Ibrahim Abdu Wakawa.

CMD 
The current chief medical director is Ibrahim Abdu Wakawa.

References 

Hospitals in Nigeria